Alegranza (sometimes spelled Alegranza!) is the second studio album by Spanish musician el Guincho. Originally released in 2007 by Discoteca Océano, it was re-released in March 2008 by Young Turks.

Critical reception

Club Fonograma named Alegranza its 2008 Album of the Year and the ninth best album of the decade. The album's opening track "Palmitos Park" was also named its 2008 Single of the Year.

Track listing
All tracks are written by Pablo Díaz-Reixa, unless otherwise noted.

References

2007 albums
El Guincho albums
Young Turks (record label) albums
Tropicália albums
Sampledelia albums